Millerton may refer to the following places:

United States of America
Millerton, Fresno County, California, a census-designated place
Millerton, Madera County, California, a former community
Millerton, former name of Fort Miller, California
Millerton, Iowa
Millerton, Kansas
Millerton, Nebraska
Millerton, New York 
Millerton (NYCRR station), a former railway station in the New York town of the same name
Millerton, Oklahoma 
Millerton, Pennsylvania
Millerton Lake, in California

Canada
Millerton, New Brunswick 

New Zealand
Millerton, New Zealand

See also
Millertown, Newfoundland and Labrador